Peninnah Gathoni Muchomba popularly known as Gathoni Wa Mucomba is Kenyan entrepreneur and politician. She is the Kiambu County Women representative in the bicameral Kenyan parliament and a member of the ruling political party, Jubilee Party of Kenya. She vied and won the Kiambu women representative post in the 2017 General election. Gathoni garnered 922,829 votes from Kiambu county constituents becoming the third highest candidate with the majority votes after President Uhuru Kenyatta and the former Prime Minister Raila Odinga.

Early life and education 
Gathoni Wa Mucomba was born in 1975 in Komothai ward, Githunguri constituency in Kiambu County which is in Central Province of Kenya. She performed exemplary well in her primary education emerging as the top student in her district. A good samaritan helped enroll her at one of Kenya's public schools, Precious Blood Secondary school in Riruta, Kiambu County after he volunteered to pay her school fees. Gathoni later joined Makuyu secondary school in Muranga County where she worked as an untrained teacher.

She later joined University of Nairobi where she took a bachelor's degree in education. While still at the university, she got a job at KBC radioKameme FM where she hosted an agricultural program. Gathoni was later recruited by Inooro FM where she hosted a popular breakfast show which ranked top among Kikuyu radio shows. She was popularly known as the 'Queen of vernacular radio.'

Career

Business

She is the founder and managing director of a vernacular digital Kikuyu television station called Utugi TV that targets farmers in Kenya.

Politics

In 2017, she won the Jubilee party of Kenya party primaries beating her closest rival Ann Nyokabi. She was elected as the Kiambu County Women representative after garnering 922,829 votes, becoming the third candidate with the highest number of votes after the presidential candidate's Uhuru Kenyatta and Raila Odinga.

Gathoni attracted controversy before she was even sworn in as the Kiambu County Women representative after she said that Kenya's parliamentarians should not have salary cuts because they need to be awarded for the work they do. Her sentiments attracted criticism from members of the public both offline and online leading to a petition to recall her. The motion did not succeed because there were not enough grounds for her to be recalled according to the County Government Act. She later apologized to Kenyans and her party leader President Uhuru Kenyatta.

She later caused a stir after she advocated for polygamy in central province, asking men to marry more than five wives if they can maintain them so that children do not grow up fatherless. Some Kenyans supported her while others criticized her for the remarks.

Gathoni is one of the most popular women representatives in Kenya due to her controversial stand on social matters.

References 

Jubilee Party politicians
1975 births
People from Kiambu County
University of Nairobi alumni
Members of the National Assembly (Kenya)
21st-century Kenyan women politicians
21st-century Kenyan politicians
Living people
Kenyan journalists
Kenyan women journalists
Kenyan radio journalists
Kenyan women radio journalists
Members of the 12th Parliament of Kenya
Members of the 13th Parliament of Kenya